Lingo Creek is a  stream flowing southeast to Indian River Bay,  northeast of Frankford in Sussex County, Delaware.

See also
List of rivers of Delaware
Lingo Point

References

Rivers of Sussex County, Delaware
Rivers of Delaware